Turkish Statistical Institute (commonly known as TurkStat;  or TÜİK) is the Turkish government agency commissioned with producing official statistics on Turkey, its population, resources, economy, society, and culture. It was founded in 1926 and has its headquarters in Ankara. Formerly named as the State Institute of Statistics (Devlet İstatistik Enstitüsü (DİE)), the Institute was renamed as the Turkish Statistical Institute on November 18, 2005.

References

External links
Official website of the institute 

National statistical services
Statistical
Organizations established in 1926
Organizations based in Ankara